Alain Bruneel (born 7 March 1952 in Tourcoing) is a French politician. A member of the Communist Party (PCF), he has been seated in the French National Assembly since 2017.

Career 
He has been the mayor of Lewarde (Nord department) since 1999.

He was elected a regional councillor in 2004 and 2010. In 2011, he was elected a Nord general councillor from the canton of Douai-Sud and resigned from the regional council to avoid holding multiple offices; he gave his seat to Christophe di Pompeo.

He was elected to the French National Assembly on 18 June 2017, representing the 16th constituency of Nord.

References 

1952 births
People from Tourcoing
French Communist Party politicians
Deputies of the 15th National Assembly of the French Fifth Republic
Living people
Politicians from Hauts-de-France